Cool Spring is an unincorporated community in Sussex County, in the U.S. state of Delaware. It is located on U.S. Route 9 and is about five miles from both Nassau and Jimtown.

History
Cool Spring's population was 200 in 1890, 193 in 1900, and 131 in 1925.

References

Unincorporated communities in Sussex County, Delaware
Unincorporated communities in Delaware